Empire Brass is a brass quintet from the United States. The group was founded in 1971. The original members met at Tanglewood Music Center (in Lenox, Massachusetts) in 1970.

Description and history
The quintet chose its name after performing in New York City. (New York is the Empire State.) They continue to tour regularly in North America, Europe, and Asia. They have been the Faculty Quintet-in-Residence at Boston University since 1976.

The Empire Brass have appeared on Good Morning America, Today Show and Mister Rogers' Neighborhood. They also make joint concert appearances with organist Douglas Major.

Members
As of May 2015, its members include:
 Derek Lockhart, trumpet
 Eric Berlin, trumpet
 Victor Sungarian, French horn
 Greg Spiridopoulos, trombone
 Kenneth Amis, tuba

Previous members include:
Rolf Smedvig, trumpet, founder; died April 27, 2015
Sam Pilafian, tuba, founder; died April 5, 2019.

Discography 
A Bach Festival
Fireworks
Joy to the World, Music of Christmas
Baroque Music for Brass and Organ
Greatest Hits
Empire Brass with The Master Chorale of Tampa Bay
Glory of Gabrieli
Empire Brass Quintet and Friends - American Brass Band Journal
Passage
King's Court and Celtic Fair
Firedance
Music of Gabrieli
Bernstein & Gershwin
Romantic Brass
The World Sings: An Empire Brass Christmas
Royal Brass
Mozart for Brass
Braggin' in Brass
Class Brass
Class Brass - On the Edge
Music for Organ, Brass & Percussion
On Broadway
Vivaldi: The Four Seasons
The Empire Brass Plays Annie
Empire Brass Quintet (Hovhaness, Hindemith, Bohme, Dvorak)
Christmas with the Master Chorale & Empire Brass
Pachelbel:Kanon & Other Baroque Favorites

References

External links 
Official website

Brass quintets
American brass bands
Musical groups established in 1972
1972 establishments in Massachusetts